The 2018–19 SK Rapid Wien season is the 121st season in club history.

Pre-season and friendlies

Bundesliga

Bundesliga fixtures and results

Play-off rounds

League table

Regular season

Relegation round

Results summary

Austrian Cup

Austrian Cup fixtures and results

Europa League

Europa League review
Rapid entered the Europa League in the 3rd qualifying round and reached the round of 32.

Qualifying rounds

Group stage

Table

Fixtures and results

Knockout phase

Knockout phase results

Team record

Squad

Squad statistics

Goal scorers

Disciplinary record

Transfers

In

Out

References

Rapid Wien
SK Rapid Wien seasons
Rapid Wien